Jolla may refer to:
 Jolla, a Finnish company that produces mobile devices and develops software
 Jolla (mobile phone), a smartphone by Jolla
 Jolla OS, a misnomer for Sailfish OS, a mobile operating system developed by Jolla
 La Jolla, a neighborhood of San Diego, California
 La Jolla Band of Luiseño Indians, a Native American tribe
 La Jolla, Placentia, California, a neighborhood of Placentia, California
 USS La Jolla (SSN-701), a United States Navy Submarine
 La Joya (disambiguation)